Asahi Shinagawa is a Japanese Muay Thai fighter, also known as Asahi P.K.Saenchaimuaythaigym in Thailand. He is a former WBC Muaythai Super Bantamweight champion.

Muay thai career
Shinagawa won his first major title in May 2020, when he defeated Yuzuki Sakai to capture the MA Japan Kick Flyweight title.

He was scheduled to fight Naki Sirilakmuaythai for the Muay Siam Isan Bantamweight title. Shinagawa won the fight by a second-round TKO. Asahi fought for the Lumpinee Stadium Japan Super Bantamweight title in June 2019, and won by a second round left hook KO.

Shinagawa made his ONE Championship debut during the ONE Japan Series: Road to Century event, against Satsuma Sazanami. He knocked Sazanami out in the first round.

He challenged Petchawalit Sor.Chitpattana for the IBF & WBC Muay Thai World Bantamweight titles. Petchawalit won the fight by unanimous decision.

In February 2020, Asahi fought Sing-Udon Aor.Aood-Udon for the WBC Muay Thai World Super Bantamweight title. He won the fight by a second-round low kick KO.

Shinagawa fought for ONE Championship for the second time during Road to One 3: Tokyo Fight Night, when he was scheduled to fight KING Kyosuke. He defeated Kyosuke by unanimous decision.

Shinagawa fought Jomrawee Refinas Gym for the IMC Featherweight title at BOM WAVE 03. He won the fight by unanimous decision.

Shinagawa was scheduled to fight Pon-chan BraveGym at BOM WAVE 04.

On February 2, 2021, it was announced that Shinagawa had signed with ONE Championship. He faced Joseph Lasiri at ONE: Winter Warriors II on December 17, 2021. He lost the bout via knockout in the first round.

Shinagawa faced Rui Botelho on November 19, 2022, at ONE 163. At the weigh-ins, Shinagawa weighed in at 126 pounds, 1 pounds over the strawweight limit and Shinagawa was fined 20% of his purse, which will go to his opponent Botelho. He won the fight via split decision.

Championships and accomplishments

Amateur
 2013 BigBang -31 kg Champion
 2014 Windy Sports -40 kg Champion
 2014 BOM -40 kg Champion
 2015 DBS Kids Tournament -40 kg Winner
 2015 MA Kick Jr -42 kg Champion
 2016 Muay Thai Open -45 kg Champion
 2016 Bigbang -45 kg Champion
 2016 MuayThaiOpen -50 kg Champion
 2016 UKF Junior -50 kg Champion
 2016 BOM -50 kg Champion

Professional
Martial Arts Japan Kickboxing Federation
 2018 MAJKF Flyweight Champion

Muay Siam Isan
 2019 Muay Siam Isan Bantamweight Champion

Lumpinee Stadium of Japan
 2019 LPNJ Super Bantamweight Champion

World Boxing Council Muaythai
 2020 WBC Muay Thai World Super Bantamweight Champion

international MuayThai Council
 2020 IMC International Featherweight Champion

International Professional Combat Council
 2022 IPCC World Featherweight Champion

Fight record

|-  style="background:#cfc;"
| 2022-11-19 || Win ||align=left| Rui Botelho || ONE 163 || Kallang, Singapore || Decision (Split)|| 3||3:00 
|-  style="background:#cfc;"
| 2022-09-23|| Win || align=left| Peym Baraikankendon || The Battle of Muay Thai "OUROBOROS" || Tokyo, Japan || KO (Left hook) || 4 || 1:36
|-
! style=background:white colspan=9 |
  
|- style="background:#fbb;"
| 2021-12-03|| Loss ||align=left| Joseph Lasiri || ONE: Winter Warriors II || Kallang, Singapore || KO (Punch & Knee) || 1 || 2:05
|-  style="text-align:center; background:#cfc;"
| 2021-07-04||  Win ||align=left| Motoaki Takahashi || The Battle Of Muay Thai WAVE 05 - Get over the COVID-19 || Yokohama, Japan || Decision (Unanimous)  || 3 ||3:00
|-  style="text-align:center; background:#cfc;"
| 2021-04-11|| Win ||align=left| Pon-chan BraveGym|| The Battle Of Muay Thai WAVE 04 - Get over the COVID-19 || Yokohama, Japan || Decision (Unanimous) || 5 || 3:00
|-  style="text-align:center; background:#cfc;"
| 2020-12-06|| Win ||align=left| Jomrawee Refinas Gym|| The Battle Of Muay Thai WAVE 03 - Get over the COVID-19 || Yokohama, Japan || Decision (Unanimous) || 5||3:00 
|-
! style=background:white colspan=9 |
|-  style="text-align:center; background:#cfc;"
| 2020-09-10||Win||align=left| KING Kyosuke || Road to One 3: Tokyo Fight Night || Tokyo, Japan || Decision (Unanimous) || 3 || 3:00
|-  style="text-align:center; background:#cfc;"
| 2020-02-09||Win||align=left| Sing-Udon Aor.Aood-Udon || The Battle Of Muay Thai SEASON II vol.7 || Tokyo, Japan || KO (Right Low Kick) || 2 || 1:44 
|-
! style=background:white colspan=9 |
|-  style="text-align:center; background:#fbb;"
| 2019-12-08||Loss||align=left| Petchawarit Sor.Jitpattana || The Battle Of Muay Thai SEASON II vol.6 pt.2 || Tokyo, Japan || Decision (Unanimous) || 5 || 3:00 
|-
! style=background:white colspan=9 |
|-  style="text-align:center; background:#CCFFCC;"
| 2019-09-01|| Win ||align=left| Satsuma Sazanami|| ONE Japan Series: Road to Century || Tokyo, Japan || KO (Left Hook) || 1 || 1:37
|-  style="text-align:center; background:#CCFFCC;"
| 2019-06-01|| Win ||align=left| Samsien Sirilakmuaythai|| The Battle Of MuayThai SEASON II vol.2 || Yokohama, Japan || KO (Left Hook) || 2 || 1:20
|-
! style=background:white colspan=9 |
|-  style="text-align:center; background:#CCFFCC;"
| 2019-04-14|| Win ||align=left| Naki Sirilakmuaythai|| The Battle Of MuayThai SEASON II vol.1 || Yokohama, Japan || TKO (Left Hooks) || 2 || 2:20
|-
! style=background:white colspan=9 |
|-  style="text-align:center; background:#fbb;"
| 2019-02-10|| Loss||align=left| Yodmeechai Kiatjamrun|| OrTorGor.3 stadium || Nonthaburi, Thailand || TKO (Left Middle Kick) || 3 ||
|-  style="text-align:center; background:#CCFFCC;"
| 2018-12-09|| Win ||align=left| Maoklee Phetsimuean|| BOMXX -The Battle Of MuaytThai 20- || Yokohama, Japan || TKO (Left Hook to the Body) || 2 ||
|-  style="text-align:center; background:#fbb;"
| 2018-08-10|| Loss||align=left| Singpayak Sitpanon|| Lumpinee Stadium || Bangkok, Thailand || TKO (Low Blow) || 2 ||
|-  style="text-align:center; background:#cfc;"
| 2018-06-30|| Win||align=left| Panomtuan Rongrienkratiemwittaya|| Lumpinee Stadium || Bangkok, Thailand || KO (Left Hook to the Body) || 2 ||
|-  style="text-align:center; background:#cfc;"
| 2018-05-20|| Win||align=left| Yuzuki Sakai|| MAJKF FIGHT FOR PEACE 9 || Tokyo, Japan || Decision (Majority)|| 3 || 3:00 
|-
! style=background:white colspan=9 |
|-  style="text-align:center; background:#fbb;"
| 2018-03-30|| Loss||align=left| Yothin Kiatyothin|| Lumpinee Stadium || Bangkok, Thailand || KO || 3 ||
|-  style="text-align:center; background:#cfc;"
| 2018-02-18|| Win||align=left| Payakdum Singmawin|| Nonthaburi Stadium || Nonthaburi, Thailand || KO (Left Hooks) || 2 ||
|-  style="text-align:center; background:#cfc;"
| 2017-12-19|| Win||align=left| Tonbai Peminburi|| Lumpinee Stadium || Bangkok, Thailand || KO (Left Hook to the Body)|| 1 ||
|-  style="text-align:center; background:#cfc;"
| 2017-09-05|| Win||align=left| Lekboran|| Lumpinee Stadium || Bangkok, Thailand || KO (Left Hook to the Body)|| 2 ||
|-  style="text-align:center; background:#cfc;"
| 2017-08-06|| Win||align=left| Shotaro Maeda|| The Battle Of Muaythai XV || Tokyo, Japan || Decision (Unanimous)|| 3 || 3:00
|-  style="text-align:center; background:#fbb;"
| 2017-07-21|| Loss||align=left| Attaphon Sor.Kongdetch|| Lumpinee Stadium || Bangkok, Thailand || KO || 3 ||
|-  style="text-align:center; background:#cfc;"
| 2017-06-18|| Win||align=left| Rachasi NornaksingTokyo|| Muay Lok 2017 2nd || Tokyo, Japan || KO (Left Hook to the Body)|| 2 ||
|-  style="text-align:center; background:#cfc;"
| 2017-04-09|| Win||align=left| Shinta|| BOM14 - The Battle Of Muay Thai 14 - || Tokyo, Japan || KO (Left Hook)|| 2 || 1:49
|-  style="text-align:center; background:#cfc;"
| 2017-03-05|| Win||align=left| Riichi Hoshino|| Muay Lok 2017 1st || Tokyo, Japan || KO (Right Hook) || 1 || 0:46
|-  style="text-align:center; background:#fbb;"
| 2016-09-30|| Loss ||align=left| Petchseekew Chor.Sampeenong|| MAX Muay Thai ||  Bangkok, Thailand || Decision || 3 ||  3:00
|-  style="text-align:center; background:#fbb;"
| 2016-06-26|| Loss||align=left| Kaito Gibu || K-SPIRIT 14 || Okinawa, Japan || Decision (Unanimous) || 5 || 3:00
|-  style="text-align:center; background:#cfc;"
| 2016-03-06|| Win||align=left| Sontichip Londiemsamkor|| Rajadamnern Stadium || Bangkok, Thailand || KO (Punches)|| 4 ||
|-  style="text-align:center; background:#fbb;"
| 2015-08-15 || Loss||align=left| Kwayna Nathakinpla || Lumpinee Stadium "Krirkkrai" || Bangkok, Thailand || Decision ||5  || 2:00
|-  style="text-align:center; background:#fbb;"
| 2015-06-20 || Loss||align=left| Satanfaa Sakdiwarun || Lumpinee Stadium "Krirkkrai" || Bangkok, Thailand || Decision ||5  || 2:00
|-
| colspan=9 | Legend:    

|-  style="background:#cfc;"
| 2016-12-25|| Win||align=left| Kyosuke Takarabe || MuayThaiOpen37 || Tokyo, Japan || Decision  || 3 || 2:00 
|-
! style=background:white colspan=9 |
|-  style="background:#cfc;"
| 2016-11-06|| Win||align=left| Tokimasa Yamaguchi || BOM Amateur 17 || Tokyo, Japan || Decision  || 3 || 2:00 
|-
! style=background:white colspan=9 |
|-  style="background:#cfc;"
| 2016-10-09|| Win||align=left| Kyosuke Zaibe || Muay Thai Super Fight Suk Wan Kingthong, vol.6 || Tokyo, Japan || Decision (Unanimous)|| 2 || 2:00
|-  style="background:#cfc;"
| 2016-10-09|| Win||align=left| Raito Tamagawa || Muay Thai Super Fight Suk Wan Kingthong, vol.6 || Tokyo, Japan || Decision (Unanimous) || 2 || 2:00
|-  style="background:#cfc;"
| 2016-07-17|| Win||align=left| Ryuto Terasaki || MuayThaiOpen35 ＆ LumpineeBoxingStadium of Japan || Tokyo, Japan || Decision  ||  ||
|-  style="background:#cfc;"
| 2016-07-17|| Win||align=left| Kyosuke Zaibe || MuayThaiOpen35 ＆ LumpineeBoxingStadium of Japan || Tokyo, Japan || Decision  ||  ||
|-  style="background:#cfc;"
| 2016-07-10|| Win||align=left| Koumei Nakamura || Bigbang Amateur 35 || Tokyo, Japan || KO || 1 ||
|-  style="background:#cfc;"
| 2016-07-10|| Win||align=left| Koki Okutomi || Bigbang Amateur 35 || Tokyo, Japan || KO || 2 ||
|-  style="background:#cfc;"
| 2016-05-01|| Win||align=left| KONOMU || World Martial Arts League 2016 UKF Championship || Tokyo, Japan || Decision (Unanimous) || 3 || 2:00 
|-
! style=background:white colspan=9 |
|-  style="background:#cfc;"
| 2016-04-29|| Win||align=left| Uta Ishida|| SMASHERS 179 || Tokyo, Japan || Decision (Unanimous) ||  ||
|-  style="background:#cfc;"
| 2016-03-27|| Win||align=left| Kohei Ohashi|| Shizuoka Kick || Shizuoka, Japan || TKO || 2 ||
|-  style="background:#cfc;"
| 2016-02-21|| Win||align=left| Ryuya Okuwaki || Bigbang Amateur 32 || Tokyo, Japan || Decision || 3 || 1:30  
|-
! style=background:white colspan=9 |
|-  style="background:#cfc;"
| 2016-02-07|| Win||align=left| Kikuchi || MuayThaiOpen 34 || Tokyo, Japan || Decision || 3 || 2:00
|-
! style=background:white colspan=9 |
|-  style="background:#fbb;"
| 2015-12-20|| Loss || align=left| Ryuya Okuwaki|| Suk Wan Kingthong, Real Champion Tournament 42 kg Final || Tokyo, Japan || Decision || ||
|-  style="background:#cfc;"
| 2015-12-20|| Win || align=left| Ryuta Nishimura|| Suk Wan Kingthong, Real Champion Tournament 42 kg Semi Final || Tokyo, Japan || Decision || ||
|-  style="background:#cfc;"
| 2015-12-06|| Win||align=left| Yushin Noguchi|| BOM 10 ～The 10th anniversary tournament～ || Yokohama, Japan || Decision || 5 || 2:00
|-  style="background:#fbb;"
| 2015-08-02|| Loss||align=left| Hyuga Umemoto || Muay Thai Super Fight Suk Wan Kingthong, Real Champion Tournament 42 kg Final || Tokyo, Japan || Decision (Unanimous)|| 2 || 1:30  
|-
! style=background:white colspan=9 |
|-  style="background:#cfc;"
| 2015-08-02|| Win||align=left| Sōta Amano || Muay Thai Super Fight Suk Wan Kingthong, Real Champion Tournament 42 kg Semi Final || Tokyo, Japan || TKO || 2 ||
|-  style="background:#cfc;"
| 2015-07-26|| Win||align=left| Ren Hiromatsu || A-LEAGUE 31 DELUXE, 40 kg Tournament Final || Sendai, Japan || Decision (Unanimous) ||  ||
|-  style="background:#cfc;"
| 2015-07-26|| Win||align=left| Akito Suwa || A-LEAGUE 31 DELUXE, 40 kg Tournament Semi Final || Sendai, Japan || Decision (Unanimous) ||  ||
|-  style="background:#c5d2ea;"
| 2015-06-14|| Draw ||align=left| Haruki Ohno || JAKF SMASHERS 6|| Japan || Decision || 2|| 2:00
|-  style="background:#cfc;"
| 2015-04-29 || Win ||align=left| Shinnosuke Hatsuda || The Battle Of Muay Thai 8  || Yokohama, Japan || Decision (Unanimous) || 5 || 2:00
|-  style="background:#c5d2ea;"
| 2015-03-29 || Draw||align=left| Yuga Ishibe|| MuayThaiPhoon vol.1||  Nagoya, Japan ||Decision  || 2 || 2:00
|-  style="background:#cfc;"
| 2015-03-08|| Win||align=left| Raito Tamagawa || MA Nihon Kick TRADITION 2～STAIRWAY TO DREAM|| Tokyo, Japan || Decision (Unanimous) || 3 || 2:00 
|-
! style=background:white colspan=9 |
|-  style="background:#cfc;"
| 2015-02-08 || Win ||align=left| Haruki Ohno ||BOM Amateur 9 || Yokohama, Japan || Decision  || 3 || 2:00
|-  style="background:#cfc;"
| 2014-12-21 || Win||align=left| Kazuki Miburo || WINDY SPORTS || Tokyo, Japan || Decision || 5 ||  
|-
! style=background:white colspan=9 |
|-  style="background:#cfc;"
| 2014-12-14 || Win||align=left| Shogo Nakajima || BOM Amateur 8 || Yokohama, Japan || Decision || 3 || 2:00  
|-
! style=background:white colspan=9 |
|-  style="background:#fbb;"
| 2014-10-19 || Loss ||align=left| Nadaka Yoshinari || WPMF BOM Amateur, Final || Yokohama, Japan || Decision || 2 || 2:00  
|-
! style=background:white colspan=9 |
|-  style="background:#cfc;"
| 2014-10-19 || Win ||align=left| Tadashi P.K || WPMF BOM Amateur, Semi Final || Yokohama, Japan || Decision || 2 || 2:00
|-  style="background:#cfc;"
| 2014-10-13|| Win||align=left| Ren Shibata || MUAYTHAI WINDY SUPER FIGHT vol.18 in Kyoto|| Kyoto, Japan ||  Decision (Majority)  || 2 || 2:00
|-  style="background:#cfc;"
| 2014-10-06|| Win||align=left| Ren Shibata || MUAY THAI WINDY SUPER FIGHT vol.18 IN KYOTO || Kyoto, Japan || Decision (Majority) || 2 || 2:00
|-  style="background:#fbb;"
| 2014-07-06 || Loss ||align=left| Haruki Ohno || The Battle of Muay Thai Amateur 7 ||  Tokyo, Japan ||Decision || 2 || 2:00
|-  style="background:#cfc;"
| 2014-07-06 || Win||align=left| Shogo Nakajima || The Battle of Muay Thai Amateur 7 ||  Tokyo, Japan ||Decision || 2 || 2:00
|- style="background:#fbb;"
| 2014-06-29||Loss|| align="left" | Ryuya Okuwaki ||Muay Thai WINDY Super Fight vol.16, Quarter Final ||Tokyo, Japan|| ||  ||
|- style="background:#cfc;"
| 2014-06-29||Win|| align="left" | Shoma Ideguchi ||Muay Thai WINDY Super Fight vol.16, First Round||Tokyo, Japan|| ||  ||
|-  style="background:#fbb;"
| 2014-05-06 || Loss||align=left| Shogo Nakajima || The Battle of Muay Thai Amateur 6 ||  Yokohama, Japan ||Decision || 3 || 2:00
|-
! style=background:white colspan=9 |
|-  style="background:#fbb;"
| 2014-04-13 || Loss ||align=left| Nadaka Yoshinari ||  BOM Amateur 5|| Yokohama, Japan || Decision || 2 || 2:00
|-  style="background:#fbb;"
| 2014-01-19 || Loss ||align=left| Rento Komiyama ||  BOM Amateur 4 || Yokohama, Japan || Decision || 2 || 2:00
|-  style="background:#fbb;"
| 2013-12-01 || Loss ||align=left| Nadaka Yoshinari  || 3rd BOM Amateur Competition, Final || Yokohama, Japan || Decision || 2 || 2:00
|-
! style=background:white colspan=9 |
|-
|-  style="background:#cfc;"
| 2013-12-01 || Win ||align=left| Ryuya Okuwaki || Battle of Muay Thai || Yokohama, Japan || Decision || 2 || 2:00
|-  style="background:#cfc;"
| 2013-09-01 || Win ||align=left| Issei Koizumi || Bigbang Amateur 16 || Tokyo, Japan || Decision || 3 || 2:00
|-
! style=background:white colspan=9 |
|-
|-  style="background:#fbb;"
| 2013-08-10 || Loss||align=left| Ryusei Kumagai || MAJKF KICK GUTS 2013 || Tokyo, Japan || Decision (Unanimous) || 2 || 2:00
|-  style="background:#c5d2ea;"
| 2013-07-14 || Draw||align=left| Ryuya Okuwaki || Bigbang Amateur 15 || Tokyo, Japan || Decision || 2 || 1:30
|-  style="background:#cfc;"
| 2013-07-14 || Win||align=left| Issei Koizumi || Bigbang Amateur 15 || Tokyo, Japan || Decision (Split) || 2 || 1:30
|-  style="background:#fbb;"
| 2013-05-12|| Loss ||align=left| Toki Tamaru || BOM Battle of Muay Thai Amateur, Final || Tokyo, Japan ||  Decision || 2 || 2:00
|-  style="background:#cfc;"
| 2013-05-05|| Win||align=left| Ryuto Tsukano || BigBang Amateur 13 || Tokyo, Japan ||  KO ||  ||
|-  style="background:#cfc;"
| 2013-04-14|| Win||align=left| Chiharu Nara || BOM I～The Battle of Muaythai～ Part.1   || Kanagawa, Japan || Decision (Split) || 2 || 2:00 
|-
| colspan=9 | Legend:

See also
List of male kickboxers
List of WBC Muaythai world champions

References

2001 births
Living people
Flyweight kickboxers
ONE Championship kickboxers
Japanese Muay Thai practitioners
Sportspeople from Kanagawa Prefecture
People from Yokohama